Euripides Ferreira (born 31 July 1966) is a Brazilian former cyclist. He competed in the team time trial at the 1992 Summer Olympics.

References

External links
 

1966 births
Living people
Brazilian male cyclists
Brazilian road racing cyclists
Olympic cyclists of Brazil
Cyclists at the 1992 Summer Olympics
Place of birth missing (living people)